Peking Road is a road between Nathan Road and Canton Road in Tsim Sha Tsui, Kowloon, Hong Kong. The road is mainly hotels and shopping area on the street level.

Name
The road was initially named Chater Road, after Paul Chater, who developed the southwest point of Tsim Sha Tsui through The Wharf. To avoid confusion with Chater Road on Hong Kong Island, the road was renamed as Peking Road in 1909, where Peking is an alternative way of romanising the name of the Chinese city Beijing.

Features
 One Peking Road (#1)
 The Langham, Hong Kong (#8)
 iSQUARE. At the corner with Nathan Road.

See also
 List of streets and roads in Hong Kong

References

Tsim Sha Tsui
Roads in Kowloon